Declan Raymond Drysdale (born 14 November 1999) is an English professional footballer who plays as a centre back for Newport County.

Career

Tranmere Rovers
Drysdale made his debut for Tranmere Rovers starting on 24 April 2017 in a National League win against Maidstone United.

Coventry City
On 4 January 2019, Drysdale completed a transfer to League One side Coventry City on a two and half year deal. He spent three-and-a-half seasons at the club but only made a handful of first-team appearances. During his first year at Coventry, he featured primarily for the club's under-23's side although he made his first-team debut in an EFL Trophy match with Southampton U23's  on 5 November 2019.

Drysdale joined Solihull Moors in January 2020 on a one-month loan deal.  Shortly after the start of the 2020–21 season, he joined Gillingham on a season-long loan deal. On 12 January, Drysdale was recalled back to the "Sky Blues". On 1 February 2021 Drysdale joined Cambridge United on loan until the end of the 2020–21 season.

In January 2022, Drysdale joined Ross County on loan the end of the 2021-22 season.

Newport County
Drysdale joined Newport County for an undisclosed fee on 7 June 2022. He made his debut for Newport on 30 July 2022 in the starting line up for the 1-1 League Two draw against Sutton United.

Career statistics

References

External links
Declan Drysdale player profile at ccfc.co.uk

English footballers
Association football defenders
Tranmere Rovers F.C. players
Coventry City F.C. players
Gillingham F.C. players
Solihull Moors F.C. players
Cambridge United F.C. players
Ross County F.C. players
Newport County A.F.C. players
English Football League players
National League (English football) players
1999 births
Living people

Sportspeople from Birkenhead
Footballers from Merseyside